KXSE (104.3 MHz) is a commercial FM radio station licensed to Davis, California, and serving the Sacramento metropolitan area. The station airs a Spanish-language adult hits radio format, one of the stations in "La Suavecita" radio network.  The studios and offices are in North Sacramento.  The transmitter is off Route 102, near Woodland Community College in Woodland, California.

History
In 1978, the station signed on the air, originally at 105.5 MHz with the call sign KYLO.  It was licensed to Davis.  The format was progressive country. The effective radiated power was 3,000 watts.

In June 1983, the station switched to Contemporary Christian music during the day with Christian talk and teaching programs airing on weeknights & morning slots hosted by Randy Zachary. The station continued with this programming until summer 1986, when it changed to an automated oldies format.

In 1989, the station changed call letters to KLCQ and installed the first full-time classic rock format in the greater Sacramento area.  The presentation was a mix of live announcers and automation.

In 1991, EZ Communications began a local marketing agreement (LMA) and later purchased the station.  The format switched to contemporary country music as KQBR, "K-Bear."  EZ built a new facility  at 104.3, selling it to Progressive Media in late 1993.

The new owners relaunched the station as Smooth Jazz "104.3 The Breeze" KQBR on November 10, 1993. This lasted until 1997, when they shifted to Urban Adult Contemporary. On September 2, 1998, at 8 a.m., it flipped to Bilingual Rhythmic Top 40 as KHZZ ("Z-104.3"), before switching again three weeks later to Rhythmic Oldies. 

In October 2000, Entravision acquired the station and flipped it to Spanish Adult Contemporary, using the co-owned "Radio Romanica" format as KRRE.  In 2003, it switched to the "Super Estrella" format, using the KXSE call letters.  

In February 2009, KXSE dropped Super Estrella and replaced it with the Spanish adult hits format known as "Jose."  In the 2010s, the format switched again to the "La Suavecita" format.

See also
 KSAC-FM
 KKFS

References

External links

XSE
Radio stations established in 1978
XSE
Entravision Communications stations
1978 establishments in California
Regional Mexican radio stations in the United States
Adult hits radio stations in the United States